Université Sainte-Anne is a French-language university in Pointe-de-l'Église, Nova Scotia, Canada. It and the Université de Moncton in New Brunswick are the only French-language universities in the Maritime Provinces.

History

It was founded on September 1, 1890 by Gustave Blanche, a Eudist Father, to facilitate the higher education of Acadians in Nova Scotia. The University was named after Saint Anne, the mother of the Virgin Mary.

In 2003, the provincial government merged the university with Collège de l'Acadie, a French-language community college with campuses throughout Nova Scotia.

Its enrolment for the 2005-2006 academic year was around 650-700 students, while in 2018, it had 390 full-time undergraduate students, 120 part-time undergrads, and 30 graduate students. 

From 3 March 2022 to 20 April 2022, the 39-member faculty union went on strike. At 49 days, it was one of the longest university strikes in Canadian history.

Academics

Université Sainte-Anne offers many university-level programs as well as college-level diploma programs. It has two faculties and one school: the Faculté des Arts et Sciences, Faculté des Programmes Professionnels and the French Immersion School. In the Faculty of Arts and Sciences, one may pursue studies in several fields: French language, literature and linguistics, history, Canadian studies, Acadian studies, commerce, English language and literature, Biology, Chemistry, Physics, General Sciences, Pre-Veterinary Studies, and Health Sciences. In the Faculty of Professional Programmes, students may pursue studies in Administrative sciences or in education. The most popular majors are: French, commerce, business administration and education.
  
In addition to the Pointe-de-l'Église main campus, students may take courses through the university at other locations: Tusket, Halifax, Petit-de-Grat and Saint-Joseph-du-Moine. Its Halifax campus offers a 1-year Bachelor of Education program and a Master of Education program.

Degree programs

At the Université Sainte-Anne, students may pursue the following degrees and diplomas:

Master's Programs
 Master of Education, teaching French as a first-language (M.Éd.)
 Master of Education, teaching French as a second-language (M.Éd.)
 Master of Education, teaching French as a first-language in a minority environment (M.Éd.)

Baccalaureate Programs
 General studies (B.A.)
 Science (three-year program) (B.Sc.)
 English studies (B.A.)
 Canadian studies (B.A.)
 Acadian studies (B.A.)
 French studies (regular degree or Honours program) (B.A., B.A. Hon.)
 History (B.A.)
 Commerce (B.A.)
 International Commerce (B.A.A.)
 Social Work (B.A.)
 Business Administration (regular degree or co-op program), (B.A.A.)
 English and French studies with concentration in translation (B.A.)
 Health studies: public health (B.tech.)
 Education (two-year program) or Arts/Education combined degree (B.A., B.Éd.)

Diploma Programs
 Business Administration, Administrative assistant diploma
 Business Information Technology or Computer Technology
 Entrepreneurship and Small Business
 Federal Government Office Clerk
 Early Childhood Education or Special Education: Teaching Assistant
 Health Sciences or Pre-veterinary Sciences (two-year programs)
 Human Services, Human Services Counselling or Continuing Health Care Services
 French (Diplôme de français fonctionnel)
 French as a second language (beginner, intermediate and advanced)
 English as a second language

Immersion

Sainte-Anne is known for its French Immersion programs. Programs take place year round including winter, spring and summer intersessions. The program is very strict about using immersion to learn the French language. If a student is caught speaking in any language other than French three times, the student is asked to leave the program, without a refund. Cultural activities and workshops are designed to allow for French to become second nature, even at a beginner level.

Notable alumni
 Louis LaPierre (B.A. 1964; honorary Ph.D. 2001), former professor of ecology and professor emeritus at the Université de Moncton, who resigned as professor emeritus at the Université de Moncton and also resigned from the Order of Canada after it was discovered that he had falsified his academic credentials.

See also
 Higher education in Nova Scotia
 List of universities in Nova Scotia
 Canadian Interuniversity Sport
 Canadian government scientific research organizations
 Canadian university scientific research organizations
 Canadian industrial research and development organizations

References

External links

Université Sainte-Anne

Universities in Nova Scotia
Catholic universities and colleges in Canada
Education in Digby County, Nova Scotia
Acadia
French-language universities and colleges in Canada outside Quebec
Buildings and structures in Digby County, Nova Scotia
Educational institutions established in 1890
Catholic Church in Nova Scotia
1890 establishments in Canada